Local elections were held in Armenia on 11 March, 10 June, 24 June and 21 October 2018.

Yerevan City Council elections were held on 23 September.

References

2018 elections in Europe
2018 in Armenia
2018
2010s in Armenian politics